Kaberneeme is a village in Jõelähtme Parish, Harju County in northern Estonia. It is famous for its beach.

See also
Kalevi-Liiva

References

External links

Kaberneeme webcam weather.ee

Villages in Harju County